Sydney McDonald Hutcheson (5 October 1897 – 2 January 1978) was an Australian rules footballer who played with Melbourne in the Victorian Football League (VFL).

Notes

External links 

1897 births
Australian rules footballers from Victoria (Australia)
Melbourne Football Club players
1978 deaths
Australian rules footballers from New South Wales
Sportspeople from Wagga Wagga